Ronald Foguenne (born 10 August 1970) is a Belgian footballer. He played in two matches for the Belgium national football team in 1995.

References

External links
 

1970 births
Living people
Belgian footballers
Belgium international footballers
Place of birth missing (living people)
Association football midfielders